The Suribachi-class ammunition ships was a class of two auxiliary vessels of the United States Navy in service from 1956 to 1995. They were among the first specialized underway replenishment ships built after World War II. The s are sometimes considered part of this class. Both ships were decommissioned in the mid-1990s and were struck from the Naval Vessel Register in 1996. Both vessels were discarded in the 2000s.

Description
The Suribachi class were the first ammunition ships specifically designed for underway replenishment for the United States Navy. The Suribachi class were designed by the Ship Characteristics Board as SCB 114. The ships had elevators installed to ease the internal handling of ammunition and explosives. Additionally as part of a refit in 1960s, the class had three holds converted to store missiles and were given high speed transfer systems for replenishment at sea.

The Suribachi class were initially armed with four twin-mounted 3"/50 caliber guns placed in superfiring positions fore and aft. However, in the 1960s, the two aft mounts were removed and a landing pad for helicopters was installed in place. The vessels mounted SPS-10 surface search radar and two Mk 36 SRBOC six-barrelled chaff launchers for electronic defense. They also had SPS-6 radar and Mark 63 Gun Fire Control System which were removed in 1977–1978. The vessels had a complement of 312 sailors including 18 officers.

Units

Construction and career

Two new purpose-built ammunition ships were authorized in 1954. As ammunition ships, the two vessels carry the names of volcanoes. The two vessels were constructed by the Bethlehem Steel Corporation at the Bethlehem Sparrows Point Shipyard in Maryland. Suribachi entered service in 1956, followed by Mauna Kea in 1957. The s are often considered part of this class, but were built to an altered design. Mauna Kea was transferred to the reserve fleet in 1979. However, due to high operational requirements, Mauna Kea rejoined the active fleet in 1982. In 1986 Mauna Kea conducted trials using portable rails for the deployment of naval mines. 

Suribachi was decommissioned in 1994, followed by Mauna Kea in 1995. Both ships were stricken from the Naval Vessel Register on 12 December 1996. Mauna Kea was used as target practice in fleet exercise in 2006, and Suribachi was scrapped at Brownsville, Texas in mid 2009.

Notes

Citations

References
 
 
 
 

 
 Suribachi class ammunition ships
 Suribachi class ammunition ships
Auxiliary transport ship classes